KKTF-LD (channel 30) is a low-power television station licensed to Chico, California, United States, affiliated with the Spanish-language UniMás network. It is owned by Sinclair Broadcast Group alongside Redding-licensed ABC affiliate KRCR-TV (channel 7) and four other low-power stations: Chico-licensed Antenna TV affiliate KXVU-LD (channel 17); MyNetworkTV affiliates Redding-licensed KRVU-LD (channel 21) and Chico-licensed KZVU-LD (channel 22), and Chico-licensed Univision affiliate KUCO-LD (channel 27). Sinclair also operates Paradise-licensed Fox affiliate KCVU (channel 20) through a local marketing agreement (LMA) with owner Cunningham Broadcasting. However, Sinclair effectively owns KCVU as the majority of Cunningham's stock is owned by the family of deceased group founder Julian Smith. The stations share studios on Auditorium Drive east of downtown Redding and maintain a news bureau and sales office at the former Sainte Television Group facilities on Main Street in downtown Chico (for FCC and other legal purposes, the Chico/Paradise-licensed stations still use the Chico address and Redding-licensed stations use the Redding address). KKTF-LD's transmitter is located along Cohasset Road northeast of Chico.

Subchannels
The station's digital signal is multiplexed:

References

External links
 UniMás website

UniMás network affiliates
Antenna TV affiliates
KTF-LD
Television channels and stations established in 2003
KTF-LD
Low-power television stations in the United States
Sinclair Broadcast Group